Val Doonican Rocks, But Gently was the only number one in the UK Albums Chart for the Irish singer, Val Doonican.  It spent three weeks at the top of that chart between 31 December 1967 and 20 January 1968, displacing The Beatles album Sgt. Pepper's Lonely Hearts Club Band which had been in that spot for many weeks.
The idea for the album came from the popular closing sequence of Doonican's TV show, in which he sang a song while seated in a rocking chair. It is one of the very few Number 1 albums never to have had an official CD release. 

There was a problem with the distribution of the album in Ireland as Pye failed to get the quantities required of the LP as Foot-and-mouth disease precautions at Dublin Airport resulted in a backlog of records to be disinfected and BEA and Aer Lingus refused to accept further supplies.

Track listing

References

1967 albums
Pye Records albums